The Meyer-Whitworth Award was a literary prize established in 1991 and awarded from 1992 until 2011 to new British playwrights to help them further their careers. The £10,000 prize, one of the largest annual prizes for play writing in the UK, was funded by the National Theatre Foundation and named in honour of Geoffrey Whitworth and Carl Meyer, both of whom were instrumental in the establishment of the Royal National Theatre. From its inception until 2006, the award was administered by Arts Council England. After that, it was administered by the Playwrights' Studio, Scotland.

According to the Playwrights' Studio, the award was given to the writer whose play best embodied Whitworth's view that "drama is important in so far as it reveals the truth about the relationships of human beings with each other and the world at large", showed promise of a developing new talent, and whose writing displayed an individual quality. The first recipient of the Meyer-Whitworth Award was Roy MacGregor for his play Our Own Kind.

List of winners
1992: Roy MacGregor for Our Own Kind 
1993: Philip Ridley for The Fastest Clock in the Universe
1994: Diane Samuels for Kindertransport
1995: Jointly to Terry Johnson for Hysteria and Billy Roche for The Cavalcaders
1996: Michael Wynne for The Knocky
1997: Conor McPherson for This Lime Tree Bower
1998: Jointly to Moira Buffini for Gabriel and Daragh Carville for Language Roulette
1999: David Harrower for Kill the Old Torture their Young
2000: Kate Dean for Down Red Lane
2001: Ray Grewal for My Dad’s Corner Shop
2002: Jointly to Gregory Burke for Gagarin Way and Henry Adam for Among Broken Hearts
2003: Gary Owen for Shadow of a Boy
2004: Owen McCafferty for Scenes from the Big Picture
2005: Stephen Thompson for Damages
2006: Dennis Kelly for Osama the Hero
2007: Morna Pearson for Distracted
2008: Hassan Abdulrazzak for Baghdad Wedding
2009: Ali Taylor for Cotton Wool
2010: Natasha Langridge for Shraddha
2011: David Ireland for Everything Between Us

References

Dramatist and playwright awards
British literary awards
Awards established in 1991
Awards disestablished in 2011
1991 establishments in the United Kingdom